90 Church Street is a federal office building in lower Manhattan in New York City. The building houses the United States Postal Service's Church Street Station, which is responsible for the 10048 and 10007 ZIP codes. The building takes up a full block between Church Street and West Broadway and between Vesey and Barclay Streets.

History
90 Church Street was designed by Cross & Cross, Pennington, Lewis & Mills and Louis A. Simon, who was Supervising Architect of the Department of the Treasury at the time. The architectural style of the building is a mixture of Neo-classicism and Art Deco. It has two towers and the facade is clad in limestone. The AIA Guide to New York City described the building as "a boring limestone monolith that has trouble deciding between a heritage of stripped down neo-Classical and a new breath of Art Deco."

The building was completed in 1935.

It was added to the National Register of Historic Places in 1989.  The building was extensively renovated by Boston Properties, Inc from the early 1990s though 2000 by Architects Swanke Hayden Connell Architects and Brannen Associates.

In addition to housing the Postal Service, the 90 Church Street building contains offices of the New York State Public Service Commission, the New York State Health Department, and the New York City Housing Authority.

September 11 attacks 
The building suffered moderate damage during the September 11 attacks due to a remnant of one of the planes and other debris landing on top of the building. Following the collapse of the World Trade Centers twin towers, the building's facade was damaged, windows were broken, the roof was seriously burned and major water damage occurred throughout the internal structure. It was also extensively contaminated with asbestos, lead dust, fungi, fiberglass dust, mercury, and bacteria.  The building was entirely engulfed by dust after the collapse of both buildings, respectively, and was further damaged when Building 7 collapsed later the same day. There was no major structural damage. During recovery efforts at Ground Zero, the United States Postal Service worked to return individual pieces of mail found by rescue workers to the addressees. In August 2004, the Church Street Station Post Office reopened, and mail was once again being processed there. Church Street Station also serves the 10007 ZIP code, covering portions of Battery Park City, Tribeca, and Civic Center.

References 
Notes

External links 

Church Street Station Post Office
Government buildings completed in 1935
Neoclassical architecture in New York City
Art Deco architecture in Manhattan